Diplaspis is a small genus of flowering plant in the family Apiaceae, with three species. It is endemic to Australia, where it occurs in Tasmania, Victoria and New South Wales.

References

Apiaceae genera
Azorelloideae
Taxa named by Joseph Dalton Hooker